Can Korkmaz (born October 21, 1992) is a Turkish professional basketball player for Darüşşafaka of the Basketbol Süper Ligi (BSL). He is a 1.88 m (6'2") tall 83 kg (183 lb.) point guard.

Professional career
Korkmaz made his professional debut with Pertevniyal Istanbul, of the Turkish Second Division, during the 2009–10 season. He moved to the Turkish club Darussafaka Istanbul for the 2011–12 season. He then joined Galatasaray Istanbul. With Galatasaray, he won the Turkish Super League championship of the 2012–13 season. After that, he moved to Trabzonspor. He joined Uşak Sportif in 2015.

On July 25, 2016, Korkmaz returned to the Turkish Super League club Galatasaray for the 2016–17 season. On July 8, 2017, he signed with Sakarya BB. on july 27 2018,  he signed with Galatasaray

On June 8, 2020, he signed with Türk Telekom of the Turkish Super League (BSL).

On July 6, 2021, he signed with Pınar Karşıyaka of the Turkish Basketball League.

On June 7, 2022, he signed with Darüşşafaka of the Basketbol Süper Ligi (BSL).

Turkish national team
Korkmaz was a member of the junior national teams of Turkey. With Turkey's junior national team, he played at the 2010 FIBA Europe Under-18 Championship.

References

External links
Euroleague.net Profile
FIBA Archive Profile
FIBA Europe Profile
Eurobasket.com Profile
TBLStat.net Profile

1992 births
Living people
Darüşşafaka Basketbol players
Galatasaray S.K. (men's basketball) players
Karşıyaka basketball players
Pertevniyal S.K. players
Point guards
Trabzonspor B.K. players
Türk Telekom B.K. players
Uşak Sportif players